Guinea-Bissau competed at the 2016 Summer Olympics in Rio de Janeiro, from August 5 to 21, 2016. It was the nation's sixth consecutive appearance at the Summer Olympics.

Five Bissauan athletes, three men and two women, were selected to the team, competing only in athletics, judo, and freestyle wrestling. Half of Guinea-Bissau's roster made their Olympic debut, with track sprinter Holder da Silva and freestyle wrestler Augusto Midana returning for their third consecutive appearance in Rio de Janeiro. Midana also reprised his role of leading the Guinea-Bissau team for the third straight time as the nation's flag bearer in the opening ceremony. Guinea-Bissau, however, has yet to win its first Olympic medal.

Athletics

Guinea-Bissau has received universality slots from IAAF to send two athletes (one male and one female) to the Olympics.

Track & road events

Field events

Judo

Guinea-Bissau has qualified one judoka for the women's extra-lightweight category (48 kg) at the Games, signifying the nation's Olympic debut in judo. Taciana Lima was directly ranked among the top 14 eligible judokas for women in the IJF World Ranking List of May 30, 2016.

Wrestling

Guinea-Bissau has qualified one wrestler for the men's freestyle 74 kg into the Olympic competition, as a result of his semifinal triumph at the 2016 African & Oceania Qualification Tournament.

On May 11, 2016, United World Wrestling awarded an additional Olympic license to Guinea-Bissau in men's freestyle 97 kg, as a response to the doping violations for the Egyptian wrestler at the African Qualification Tournament, extending the roster size to two.

Men's freestyle

References

External links
 
 

Nations at the 2016 Summer Olympics
2016
Olympics